Montreal has a large and well-developed communications system, including several English and French language television stations, newspapers, radio stations, and magazines.  It is Canada's second-largest media market, and the centre of francophone Canada's media industry.

Television stations 

Canada's major French-language networks are all headquartered within a few blocks of each other on Boulevard René-Lévesque in downtown Montreal.

Network programming from the United States is provided on cable via stations from the Burlington, Vermont/Plattsburgh, New York market; see :Template:Champlain Valley TV. Several Burlington/Plattsburgh stations can be received over the air in Montreal, including: WPTZ (NBC), WVNY-TV (ABC), WCAX (CBS), WFFF (FOX), WETK (PBS) and WCFE (PBS). Montreal is ten times larger than the entire American population of the Burlington/Plattsburgh market; indeed, for decades most stations in that market before CRTC regulations and growth in the region itself identified as serving "Burlington/Plattsburgh/Montreal," and depended on advertising in Montreal for their survival.

Daily newspapers 

 Le Devoir (French)
 Montreal Gazette (English)
 Le Journal de Montréal (French)
 La Presse (French)

Free daily newspapers 
 24H (French)
 Métro (French)

Weekly newspapers 
Also known as "alternative" or "cultural" weeklies:

 African Reflection (English)
 Avenir de l'est (French)
 Brossard Journal (English, French)
 Cités Nouvelles (French)
 Courrier Ahuntsic & Bordeaux-Cartierville (French)
 Cult MTL (English)
 East End Suburban (English)
 Exclaim! (English) (National: Canadian monthly)
  Guide Montréal-Nord (French)
 Ici (French)
 Journal de Rosemont - La Petite-Patrie (French)
 Journal de St-Michel (French)
 L'Express d'Outremont & Mont-Royal (French)
 L'Informateur de Rivière-des-Prairies (French)
  La Voix Pop (French)
 Le Flambeau de l'Est (French)
  Le Magazine de L'île des Soeurs (French)
  Le Messager Lachine & Dorval (French)
 Le Messager LaSalle (French)
 Le Messager Verdun (French)
  Le Messager Week-End (French, monthly)
 Le Plateau  (French)
 Le Québécois Libre (French)
 Matin (French)
 Montréal Express (French, web only)
 Montreal Times (English)
  Nouvelles Hochelaga-Maisonneuve (French)
  Nouvelles Park-Extension News (English, French)
  Nouvelles Saint-Laurent News (French,  English)
 Place Publique (English, French)
 Progrès Saint-Léonard  (French)
 Progrès Villeray - Parc-Extension (French)
 St-Lambert Journal (English, French)
 The Eastern Door (English)
 The Free Press (English)
 The Montreal Tribune (English)
 The Montrealer (English)
 The Senior Times (English)
 The Suburban (English)
 Voir (French)
 West End Times (English)
 West Island Gazette (English)
 West Island Life (English)
 Westmount Independent (English)
 Westmount Life (English)

Campus newspapers

Student newspapers

 McGill Tribune (English, McGill University)
 The Bull & Bear (English, McGill University)
 The Concordian (English, Concordia University)
 Le Délit français (French, McGill University)
 L'intérêt (French, HEC Montréal)
 The Link (English, Concordia University)
 The McGill Daily (English, McGill University)
 McGill International Review (MIR) (Bilingual, McGill University)
 Montréal Campus (French, Université du Québec à Montréal)
 Le Polyscope (French, Polytechnique Montréal)
 Quartier Libre (French, Université de Montréal)
 The Plant, (English, Dawson College)

University newspapers
 Le Forum (French, Université de Montréal)
 McGill Reporter (English, McGill University)

Ethnic newspapers 

 BHMA (Greek)
 Canadian Jewish News (English, Jewish)
 Corriere Italiano (Italian)
 Das Echo (German)
 Golos Obszhini (Russian)
 Hafteh (Persian)
 Horizon Weekly (Armenian)
 Humsafar Times (English, Punjabi)
 Medad (Afghan And Iranian community) (Persian)
 Montreal Community Contact (English, Black, Caribbean)
 The Montreal Greek Times (Greek)
 Phoenicia (Arabic, English, French)
 Polski Bulletin (Polish)
 Sada Al-Mashrek (Arabic, English, French)
 Știri de Montreal (Romanian)
 Ta Nea (Greek)

Defunct newspapers 

 Hudson Gazette (English)
 The Monitor (English)
 Montreal Mirror (English)
 Montreal Star (English)
 West Island Chronicle (English)
 Westmount Examiner (English)

Magazines (independent from newspapers) 
See also magazines published in Montreal.

 Art/iculation (English, French)
 Cult MTL (English)
 Maisonneuve (English)
 mauditsfrancais.ca (French)
 Panoram Italia (English, French, Italian)
 Journaldesvoisins.com (French)

Radio stations 

A number of radio stations from New York and Vermont may be heard in Montreal, most notably WVMT 620 AM, WEAV 960 AM, WEZF 92.9 FM, WQLR 94.7 FM, WBTZ 99.9 FM, and WVPS 107.9 FM. WQLR, while based in the United States, is focused on Montreal as a rimshotter. CFRA 580 AM from Ottawa is also clearly available in Montreal, as is CITE-FM-1 102.7 FM from Sherbrooke (a sister station of, but programmed separately from, CITE-FM).

The Greater Montreal area had a number of radio stations that were shut down over the years. 

In 2013, the new local media firm Tietolman-Tétrault-Pancholy Media, whose partners included former Montreal City Councillor Nicolas Tétrault, received licenses to launch three new radio stations on the AM band: a French sports station on AM 850, an English talk radio station on AM 600, and a French talk radio station on AM 940. As of August 2016, the AM 850 license has lapsed unbuilt, with both of the other licenses due to expire in November if the stations have not launched by then.

References

Montreal
 
Media, Montreal
Montreal-related lists